Truth in Sincerity is the second full-length album by the pop punk band Amber Pacific and was one of the most anticipated pop punk albums of 2007. It was released on May 22, 2007. The first singles from the album were "Fall Back Into My Life" and "You're Only Young Once." Will Nutter has stated that "Follow Your Dreams, Forget The Scene" was made to a special fan of the band. The song "Runaway" features vocals from Mike Herrera of MxPx. On May 16, 2007, the entire album was available to stream on Amber Pacific's MySpace profile.

The album sold around 10,000 copies in its first week in America and debuted at number 64 on the Billboard 200. It has now sold a total of 35,000 copies in the US.

Track listing

Production 
Stephen Bryant — violin
Sue Jane Bryant — viola
Walter Gray — cello
Rick Hanson — electric guitar
Will Nutter — electric guitar/backup vocals/piano
Dango — drums
Greg Strong — bass guitar
Matt Young  — lead vocals
Davy Rispoli — additional back-up vocals

Personnel:
William "Billy" Brown, David Dressel — engineers
Martin Feveyear — producer, engineer, mixing
Vlado Meller — mastering

Charts

References

2007 albums
Amber Pacific albums
Hopeless Records albums
Albums produced by Martin Feveyear